FC Algeti is a Georgian football club from Marneuli, currently competing in the fourth tier of Georgian football league.

The club currently plays home matches in Tbilisi. 

The name comes from the Algeti river.

History
Algeti participated in Georgian second division for years before being relegated after the 2015/16 season. 

The club participated in Liga 3 for two years, but they quit it following the 2018 season after ten teams in the bottom half of the table formed Liga 4. 

In 2020 Algeti came third in White Group of the league, below two promotion places, and the next two years they finished just above the drop-zone.

Seasons

References

Algeti Marneuli